The Wily Chaperon is a 1915 American silent short comedy-drama film directed by Thomas Ricketts. The film stars Perry Banks, Charlotte Burton, William Tedmarsh, Louise Lester, Vivian Rich, and Harry Van Meter.

External links

1915 films
1915 comedy-drama films
1910s English-language films
American silent short films
American black-and-white films
Films directed by Tom Ricketts
1910s American films
Silent American comedy-drama films
Comedy-drama short films